Longwood Crossing is an unincorporated community in Fayette County, Indiana, in the United States.

History
The post office that the community of Longwood Crossing once contained was called Philpotts Mills, and Longwood.

The post office called Philpotts Mills opened in 1832, and was renamed Longwood in 1837. The Longwood post office closed permanently in 1901.

References

Unincorporated communities in Fayette County, Indiana
Unincorporated communities in Indiana